Cairoli is an Italian name. It may refer to:
Geography
 Gropello Cairoli, a municipality in the Province of Pavia
Transportation
 Cairoli, a station of the Milan Metro
People
 The Cairoli brothers
 Benedetto Cairoli, an Italian statesman
 Enrico Cairoli, an Italian patriot
 Giovanni Cairoli, an Italian patriot
 Adelaide Cairoli, their mother, also a patriot
 Charlie Cairoli, an Italian-English clown
 Matteo Cairoli, an Italian racing driver
 Milton Cairoli, a Uruguayan lawyer and judge
 Tony Cairoli, an Italian motorcycle racer